NGC 1052-DF2 is an ultra diffuse galaxy (UDG) in the constellation Cetus, which was identified in a wide-field imaging survey of the NGC 1052 group by the Dragonfly Telephoto Array. It has been proposed that the galaxy contains little or no dark matter, the first such discovery. On 20 March 2019, a follow-up study announcing the discovery of a second UDG lacking dark matter, NGC 1052-DF4, was published.

Distance
Initial observations of NGC 1052-DF2 used its surface brightness fluctuation to estimate its distance at 20 Mpc.

On 3 June 2019, however, a separate team used a full observing dataset on the same object to review this claim. They proposed that the distance to the galaxy may be different, and that it may contain dark matter after all.

A more recent study on NGC 1052-DF2 suggested the previously reported distance of the galaxy may have been greatly exaggerated. Consequently, the galaxy appeared to look "normal" in every way. Using five independent methods to estimate distances of heavenly bodies, a team of researchers from the Instituto de Astrofísica de Canarias (IAC) found the correct distance of NGC 1052-DF2 to be 42 million light years (13 MPc), not some 64 million light years (19 MPc) from the Earth. The total mass of the galaxy was around one-half of the mass estimated previously, but the mass of its stars was only about one-quarter of the previously estimated mass. This implied a significant part of NGC 1052-DF2 could be made up of dark matter, like any other galaxy.

Follow-up observations using Hubble Space Telescope Advanced Camera for Surveys imaging measured the tip of the red-giant branch distance to NGC 1052-DF2, which IAC researchers detected at 13 Mpc, to be 22.1±1.2 Mpc, consistent with earlier surface brightness fluctuation measurements.  The distance to NGC 1052-DF2 and its consequences for interpreting observations of the galaxy remain disputed.

Dark matter
The apparent lack of dark matter in NGC 1052-DF2 may help prove that dark matter is real: If what appears to be dark matter is really just a currently unknown effect of the gravity of ordinary matter then this apparent dark matter should also appear in this galaxy. Further study will be needed before this and any other possible implications can be confirmed. If confirmed, the absence of dark matter may also have implications for theories of galaxy formation, as dark matter has been thought to be needed for galaxy formation.

A later study purports to show that the galaxy may contain more dark matter than initially reported. It may have a mass-to-light ratio towards the low end of expected values for a dwarf galaxy. However, a follow-up study on 20 March 2018 and a new discovery of a second ultra diffuse galaxy, NGC 1052-DF4, also apparently lacking dark matter, challenges the prior study's conclusion. In June 2021 further observations by Hubble have confirmed NGC 1052-DF2 as deficient in dark matter.

Other similar galaxies
Astronomers discovered a second Galaxy with no dark matter, NGC 1052-DF4, which is another ultra diffuse galaxy - quite large, spread-out, and faint to observe. Discovering another galaxy with very little to no dark matter means the chances of finding more of these galaxies may be higher than cosmologists previously thought.

Another group of astronomers have found the existence of tidal tails in NGC 1052-DF4 indicating that the lack of dark matter has been caused by the interaction with a nearby neighbor (a low mass disk galaxy, NGC 1035). The interaction naturally explains the low content of dark matter inferred for this galaxy and reconciles these type of galaxies with our current models of galaxy formation.

See also
 Abell 520
 Bullet cluster
 Dragonfly 44 – a galaxy thought to be almost all dark matter.

References 

1052
Cetus (constellation)
Dwarf galaxies